Macdunnoughia confusa (Dewick’s plusia) is a moth of the family Noctuidae. It was first described by James Francis Stephens in 1850. It is found from Europe through Siberia to Japan and is also present in Lebanon and Israel.

The moth flies in three generations from April to October .

The larvae feed on various herbaceous plants such as Lamium, nettle, Artemisia absinthium and chamomile.

Notes
The flight season refers to Belgium and The Netherlands. This may vary in other parts of the range.

External links
 
 Dewick’s Plusia at UKmoths
 
 Lepiforum.de
 Vlindernet.nl 

Plusiini
Moths described in 1850
Moths of Europe
Moths of Japan
Moths of the Middle East
Moths of Asia
Taxa named by James Francis Stephens